Kəngərli (also, Kənğərli, Kengerli, and Kengerly) is a village and municipality in the Tartar Rayon of Azerbaijan.  It has a population of 1,361.

References 

Populated places in Tartar District